The demography of the Republic of Bulgaria is monitored by the National Statistical Institute of Bulgaria.

This article is about the demographic features of the population of Bulgaria, including population density, ethnicity, education level, health of the populace, economic status, religious affiliations and other aspects of the population.

Bulgaria has a high Human Development Index of 0.813, ranking 51st in the world in 2018 and holds the 38th position in Newsweeks rankings of the world's best countries to live in, measuring health, education, political environment and economic dynamism.

Demographic history

Various estimates have put Bulgaria's medieval population at 1.1 million in 700 AD and 2.6 million in 1365. At the 2011 census, the population inhabiting Bulgaria was 7,364,570 in total, but more recent estimates calculate that the population has declined to 6.9 million. The peak was in 1989, the year when the borders opened after a half of a century of communist regime, when the population numbered 9,009,018.

Note: Crude migration change (per 1000) is an extrapolation 

Vital statistics

Vital Statistics 1875 to 1915
The total fertility rate is the number of children born per woman. It is based on fairly good data for the entire period. Sources: Our World in Data and Gapminder Foundation.

 Vital statistics 1900–1915 

 Vital statistics 1916–1940 

Vital statistics 1941 to present

Source: National Statistical Institute
/

Current vital statistics

 Birth rates and fertility 

In 2016 a total of 64,984 live births were recorded in Bulgaria. The country has a crude birth rate of 9.1‰.

Seventy years ago (in the census of 1946), Bulgaria had a crude birth rate of 25,6‰. Ethnic Bulgarians (23,3‰) had a much lower crude birth rate compared to the two largest minorities: Turks (40,9‰) and Roma (47,2‰). However, it is unlikely that this difference continued since then, as birth rates in the Balkan countries dropped sharply.

Bulgaria has a low total fertility rate of 1.54 children per woman (at the end of 2016). This is up significantly from the late 1990s, but still below replacement and not enough to prevent further population decline, especially with emigration. Provinces with large Roma populations (for example Sliven, Montana and Yambol) tend to have higher fertility rates (and higher death rates) compared to other areas, whereas Turkish fertility is similar to the Bulgarian majority.

 Regional differences 
As of 2017, the municipality of Nikolaevo has the highest crude birth rate with 18.6‰, followed by Tvarditsa (16.7‰) and Kaynardzha (15.7‰). All these municipalities have relatively large Romani populations.

On the other hand, the municipalities of Georgi Damyanovo, Banite and Nevestino have a extremely low birth rates. These municipalities are almost exclusively inhabited by ethnic Bulgarians.

 Teenage pregnancy 
Bulgaria has one of the highest share of teenage pregnancy in Europe. Nevertheless, this number is declining rapidly in recent years.

The ten municipalities with the largest absolute number of teenage mothers are: Sliven (373), Sofia (339), Plovdiv (245), Pazardzhik (161), Stara Zagora (141), Nova Zagora (131), Burgas (108), Yambol (106), Haskovo (96) and Varna (86).

 Life expectancy at birth 

Total population:  74.83 years
Male:  71.37 years
Female:  78.39 years (2016-2018 est.)

Average life expectancy at age 0 of the total population.

Kardzhali Province and Sofia City have the highest life expectancy with 76.6 years for both sexes. The lowest life expectancy is recorded in the Northwestern provinces like Montana (72.7 years), Vratsa (72.8 years) and Vidin (72.9 years).

 Infant mortality rate 
Total:  5.8 deaths/1,000 live births (2018)
Male:  6.2 deaths/1,000 live births (2018)
Female:  5.3 deaths/1,000 live births (2018)

 Projections 

The following forecast for the future population is an official estimate of the National Statistical Institute of Bulgaria.

Demographic statistics

Demographic statistics according to the World Population Review.

One birth every 8 minutes
One death every 5 minutes
One net migrant every 111 minutes
Net loss of one person every 11 minutes

Demographic statistics according to the CIA World Factbook, unless otherwise indicated.

Population
6,519,789 (Sept 2021 cens)
6,919,180 (July 2021 est.)
7,057,504 (July 2018 est.)

Ethnic groups 
Bulgarian 76.9%, Turkish/Balkan Gagauz 8%, Romani 4.4%, other 0.7% (including Russian, Armenian, and Vlach), other (unknown) 10% (2011 est.)
note: Romani populations are usually underestimated in official statistics and may represent 9–11% of Bulgaria's population

Languages 
Bulgarian (official) 76.8%, Balkan Gagauz 8.2%, Romani 3.8%, other 0.7%, unspecified 10.5% (2011 est.)

Religions 
Eastern Orthodox 59.4%, Muslim 7.8%, other (including Catholic, Protestant, Armenian Apostolic Orthodox, and Jewish) 1.7%, none 3.7%, unspecified 27.4% (2011 est.)

Age structure 

0-14 years: 14.52% (male 520,190 /female 491,506)
15-24 years: 9,4% (male 340,306 /female 312,241
25-54 years:42.87% (male 1,538,593 /female 1,448,080)
55-64: 13.15% (male 433,943 /female 482,784)
65 years and over: 20.06% (male 562,513 /female 835,065) (2020 est.)

0-14 years: 14.6% (male 530,219 /female 500,398)
15-24 years: 9.43% (male 346,588 /female 318,645)
25-54 years: 43.12% (male 1,565,770 /female 1,477,719)
55-64 years: 13.3% (male 442,083 /female 496,888)
65 years and over: 19.54% (male 557,237 /female 821,957) (2018 est.)

Median age 
total: 43.7 years. Country comparison to the world: 20
male: 41.9 years
female: 45.6 years (2020 est.)
total: 43 years. Country comparison to the world: 22nd
male: 41.2 years 
female: 44.9 years (2018 est.)

Birth rate 
8.15 births/1,000 population (2021 est.) Country comparison to the world: 218th
8.5 births/1,000 population (2018 est.) Country comparison to the world: 215th

Death rate 
14.52 deaths/1,000 population (2021 est.) Country comparison to the world: 3th
14.5 deaths/1,000 population (2018 est.) Country comparison to the world: 4th

Total fertility rate 
1.49 children born/woman (2021 est.) Country comparison to the world:204th
1.47 children born/woman (2018 est.) Country comparison to the world: 201st

Net migration rate 
-0.29 migrant(s)/1,000 population (2021 est.) Country compy to the world:115

Population growth rate 
-0.67% (2021 est.) Country comparison to the world: 229th

Mother's mean age at first birth 
27.1 years (2017 est.)

Dependency ratios 
total dependency ratio: 56.6 (2020 est.)
youth dependency ratio: 23 (2020 est.)
elderly dependency ratio: 33.6 (2020 est.)
potential support ratio: 3 (2020 est.)

Urbanization 
urban population: 75.7% of total population (2020)
.rate of urbanization: -0.22% annual rate of change (2015-20 est.)
potential support ratio: 3.3 (2015 est.)

Life expectancy at birth
total population: 75.3 years. Country comparison to the world: 122th
male: 72.08 years 
female: 78.73 years (2021 est.)

Literacy
definition: age 15 and over can read and write (2015 est.)
total population: 98.4% 
male: 98.7% 
female: 98.1% (2015 est.)

School life expectancy (primary to tertiary education)
total: 14 years 
male: 14 years 
female: 14 years (2016)

Unemployment, youth ages 15–24
total: 12.7%. Country comparison to the world: 108th
male: 13.2% 
female: 13.9% (2018 est.)

 Sex ratio 
Of the total 7,364,570 as of 2011, 3,586,571 are males and 3,777,999 are females, or there are 1,053 women for every 1,000 men.

 Demographic policies 

The progressive decrease of the Bulgarian population is hindering economic growth and welfare improvement, and the management measures taken to mitigate the negative consequences do not address the essence of the problem. The Government Program for the period 2017 - 2021 is the first one that aims at overturning the trend. The program also identifies the priority means for achieving this goal: measures to increase the birth rate, reduce youth emigration, and build up regulatory and institutional capacity to implement a modern immigration policy tailored to the needs of the Bulgarian business.L. Ivanov. Measures to solve demographic problems. Business Club Magazine. Issue 11, 2017. pp. 18-20.  (in Bulgarian and English)

 Ethnic groups 

The following table shows the ethnic composition of all Provinces of Bulgaria according to the 2011 census(% from the declared):

 Languages 

The 2001 census defines an ethnic group as a "community of people, related to each other by origin and language, and close to each other by mode of life and culture"; and one's mother tongue as "the language a person speaks best and usually uses for communication in the family (household)".
According to the 2011 census, among the Bulgarians 99.4% indicate Bulgarian as a mother tongue, 0.3% - Turkish/Balkan gagauz, 0.1% - Roma and 0.1% others; among Turks 96.6% have pointed the Turkish/Balkan Gagauz as a mother tongue and 3.2% - Bulgarian; among the Roma 85% indicate Roma language as a mother tongue, 7.5% - Bulgarian, 6.7% - Turkish/Balkan gagauz and 0.6% - Romanian.

 Religion 

Bulgaria's traditional religion according to the constitution is the Orthodox Christianity, while Bulgaria is a secular state too. Since the last two censuses (2001 and 2011) provide widely divergent results, they are both shown in the table below. It is noteworthy that over a fifth of the population chose not to respond to this question in the 2011 census.

{| style="border="0"
|-
| style="width:120px;"|
| style="width:100px;"|
| style="width:250px;"|
|-
|
| 2001| 2011'''
|-
| Orthodox Christian
| 82.6%
| 59.4%
|-
| Muslim
| 12.2%
| 7.8% (7.4% Sunni; 0.4% Shia)|-
| Catholic
| 0.6%
| 0.7%
|-
| Protestant
| 0.5%
| 0.9%
|-
| Other| 0.2%
| 0.15%
|-
| None| 3.9%
| 9.3%
|-
| No response| -
| 21.8%''
|}

The results of the Bulgarian 2011 Census, in which the indication of answer regarding the question for confession was optional, are as follows:

The results of the Bulgarian 2001 Census by ethnic groups, the latest census in which the indication of identification (whether by confession or as irreligious) in the question for confession was obligatory, are as follows:

Migration

The first censuses of the Principality of Bulgaria and the autonomous province of Eastern Rumelia in 1880 recorded 31,786 and 17,970 Bulgarian refugees from Macedonia and Ottoman Thrace, respectively, who accounted for 1.38% of the population of the Principality an 2.20% of the population of the autonomous province, respectively. The census of the Principality also counted a total of 37,635 people, or 1.88% of the population, born in a country other than the Ottoman Empire, mostly Bulgarians from Romania, Northern Dobruja and Bessarabia. By 1887, when the first joint census of the Principality and the autonomous province was conducted following their peaceful unification in 1885, the number of the refugees from the Ottoman Empire had grown to 54,462 people, or 1.73% of the population, while the rest of the foreign-born population had fallen to 31,637 people, 9,831 of whom born in the Russian Empire, 11,843 in Romania, 2,690 in Serbia and 7,273 elsewhere.

According to the 1910 census, 300,000 or almost 10% of the ethnic Bulgarians were born in another Bulgarian municipality than the one they were enumerated in. The same data shows that the foreign-born ethnic Bulgarians numbered 78,000, or 2% of them, most numerous of whom were the 61,000 Ottoman-born, 9,000 Romanian-born and by less than 2,000 Austro-Hungarian, Serbian and Russian-born. By the 1926 census, there had been 253,000 refugees with granted households and land or citizenship but with many more in towns of uncertain number. 35% came from Eastern Thrace, 30% came from Greek Macedonia, another 18% from Western Thrace, 8% from Dobruja, 4% from the Western Outlands, 3% from Asia Minor, and 2% from North Macedonia. They constituted 6% of the country's population. In 1940, 70,000 Bulgarians were exchanged from Northern Dobruja. The total number of refugees in 1878-1940 is estimated at between 700,000 and 1,200,000.

According to the 2011 census Russian citizens are the most numerous foreigners - 11 991, followed by 8 444 EU citizens (UK- 2 605, Greece - 1 253, Germany- 848, Poland - 819 and Italy - 456), citizens of Ukraine - 3 064, North Macedonia - 1 091, Moldova - 893 and Serbia - 569. 22.8% of them are from Asia, mostly from Turkey. Those with dual Bulgarian and other citizenship were 22 152, or 0.3% of the population. Of them persons with Bulgarian and Russian citizenship were 5 257 (23.7%), followed by persons with Bulgarian and Turkish citizenship - 4 282 (19.3%), Bulgarian and citizenship of the USA- 1 725 (7.8%). There are at least 17,527 Refugees of the Syrian Civil War with applications in Bulgaria. In 2001-2015 185,447 people applied for Bulgarian citizenship and 116,222 were provided with. 113,647 were granted on grounds of proven Bulgarian ancestry, including 59,968 North Macedonia citizens. 29,218 were Moldovan citizens, 5930 Ukrainians, 5374 Serbians, 5194 Russians, 3840 Israeli, 2192 Albanians, 692 Turks and others. In 2016, 12,880 foreigners were naturalized, including 6196 Macedonians.

Population by country of birth:

Foreigners by nationality:

Age structure 
0–14 years:  13.2%
15–65 years:  68.3%
65 years and over:  18.5% (Census 2011)
At the 2011 census the largest decadal age group of the identified as Romani people is the 0–9 years old or 21% of them, the same age group accounted for 10% of the Turks and 7% of the Bulgarians. Experts estimate that the Romani in some provinces make up 40% of all aged between 0 and 9 years. Amongst those who did not answer the question on
ethnic group lowest is the share of people aged 60+ years.

Bulgarian children constitute the majority of all children in 23 out of 28 provinces. They constitute more than ninety percent of all children in two provinces: Sofia (city) (92%) and Pernik Province (90%).

Turkish children constitute the majority in Kardzhali Province (68% of self-declared) and Razgrad Province (50% of self-declared); they also constitute the largest group of all children in Silistra Province (43%).

Roma children constitute 12% of all children in Bulgaria and more than a quarter in three provinces: Montana (29%), Sliven (28%) and Yambol (27%).

Bulgaria is ageing rapidly, especially in some remote rural areas. 

The ageing of the population leads to an increase of the median age. The median age is 43.6 as of 2017, up from 40.4 years in 2001.

Education 

Over 98% of the population is literate, the males being more literate than the females.

According to the 2011 census, about 112,778 people aged nine or more are illiterate. There are considerable differences in the share of illiterate persons amongst the three main ethnic groups. Amongst the Bulgarian ethnic group the share of illiterate is 0.5%, amongst the Turkish - 4.7% and amongst the Roma ethnic group - 11.8%. About 81 thousand people aged seven or more never visited school.

Unemployment 

The median unemployment for the country in 2011 was 10.1%.

The number of unemployed people declined to 207 thousand people (or around 6.2% of the population) in 2017.

Most unemployed people are aged 15 to 24 years old.

The unemployment rate in rural areas (around 10.0%) is nearly two times higher than the unemployment rate in urban areas (approximately 5.1%).

Vidin Province has the highest unemployment rate with almost one fifth of its labour force being unemployed. The provinces of Shumen (15.9%), Silistra (12.5%) and Targovishte (12.4%) have also very high unemployment rates.

Other statistics

Home ownership 
According to Eurostat, 82.3% per cent of the population live in privately owned and owner-occupied homes, ranking it as 12th highest in ownership globally. It is down from a recent peak of 87.6% in 2008, and has been steadily falling since.

Internet penetration 
The number of Internet users has increased rapidly since 2000—from 430,000 their number grew to 1.55 million in 2004, and 3.4 million (48 per cent penetration rate) in 2010. Bulgaria has the third-fastest average Broadband Internet speed in the world after South Korea and Romania with an average speed of 1,611 kbit/s.

Mobile phone adoption 
Currently there are three active mobile phone operators—Mtel, Telenor and Vivacom, Mtel is the largest one with 5.2 million users as of 2010, Telenor has 3,9 million as of 2007 and Vivacom over 1 million.

HIV 
Bulgaria's HIV rate is among the lowest in the world, being 0.1% or 3,800 infected as of 2009.

Urbanization 

Most Bulgarians (72.5 per cent) reside in urban areas. Approximately one-sixth of them live in Sofia, which has a population exceeding 1,200,000 people.

Urban population:  5,338,261 or 72.5% of total population (Census 2011)
Rural: 2,026,309 or 27.5%
Rate of urbanization: -0.3% annual rate of change (2005–10 est.)

See also 
 Immigration to Bulgaria
 Immigration to Europe
 List of countries by immigrant population
 Bulgaria
 Ageing of Europe

Notes

References

External links

 2005 Report on European Demography, Eurostat
 Annual report of the National Statistics Institute for 2005 regarding population and demographic processes
 Urbanization,1910-1946
 Bulgarian Subject Files – Social Issues: Minorities, Blinken Open Society Archives, Budapest
 Bulgarians – Species on the Brink

 
Society of Bulgaria